The Notre Dame Hounds are a junior "A" ice hockey team based in Wilcox, Saskatchewan, Canada. They are members of the Saskatchewan Junior Hockey League (SJHL).  The Hounds also had a junior "B" team that played in the South Saskatchewan Junior B Hockey League, but the team folded after the 2005–06 Season. The team plays its homes games in Duncan McNeill Arena, which has a seating capacity of 1,200. The team colors are red and white.

History

The Hounds entered the SJHL in 1970 until 1976 when, after a dismal season, they left the SJHL.  Not much is known about the franchise between 1976 and 1987.  It is known that they operated as a Midget "AAA" minor hockey team until 1987 and lost the final of the Canadian Midget Championship, the Air Canada Cup, to the Quebec seed in the tournament. The AAA team has continued and all parts of the Notre Dame Hounds are affiliated with Athol Murray College of Notre Dame.

In 1987, the Hounds came straight into Tier II Junior "A" from minor hockey. The team came out of the regular season with a series of tight victories, but enough of them to earn them a berth in the playoffs. The Hounds, operating well as a unit that had stayed mostly intact for the previous three seasons, found little trouble winning the SJHL Championship, with only the Yorkton Terriers taking the Hounds as far as six games before the Terrier were eliminated.  The Hounds moved on to the ANAVET Cup to face the Winnipeg South Blues of the Manitoba Junior Hockey League.  The Hounds swept the series in four games and moved on to face the Calgary Canucks of the Alberta Junior Hockey League for the Abbott Cup.  The Hounds initially trailed in the series 3-games-to-1 before coming back in games five and six. In game seven with a 3-2 lead, future National Hockey League (NHL) goaltender Curtis Joseph led the team to a victory and a berth into the Centennial Cup. In the first game, the Hounds played the Halifax Lions of the Metro Valley Junior Hockey League, defeating them 6–5. In the second game, they played the Thunder Bay Flyers of the United States Hockey League, resulting in a 9–7 win. The Hounds then played the Pembroke Lumber Kings of the Central Junior A Hockey League and lost in triple overtime by a score of 4–3. The semi-final re-matched them against the Lumber Kings, and avenged the previous loss with a 7–3 win, setting up a final between the Hounds and the Lions. The Hounds trailed 2–1 after two periods of play. The score was evened in the third period until future NHL player Rod Brind'Amour assisted on Dwayne Norris' game-winning goal for the Hounds. Brind'Amour won awards for being the Top Scorer, Most Valuable Player, and Top Centre, while another future NHL player, Joby Messier, won Top Defenseman.

Perhaps the team's best-known contribution to the NHL is the Toronto Maple Leafs Hound Line of the 1985–86 season, when Gary Leeman, Wendel Clark, and Russ Courtnall played on the same forward line. Although those individuals played for the AA midget team were not on the same line; Wendel Clark was a defenceman until he played with the world junior team.

From the 1987–88 championship team, 19 players graduated to the National Collegiate Athletic Association hockey teams, and some, like Rod Brind'Amour, Curtis Joseph, Joby Messier, Dwayne Norris, Jason Herter, and Scott Pellerin, made it to the National Hockey League.

Since 1995, the Hounds have only failed to make the SJHL playoffs three times, but have yet to win their second league title.

Season-by-season standings 
GP = Games Played, W = Wins, L = Lose, T = Tie, OTL = Overtime Lose, GF = Goals For, GA = Goals Against, P = Points

Playoffs
 1971 DNQ
 1972 Lost Quarter-final
Saskatoon Olympics defeated Notre Dame Hounds 4-games-to-none
 1973 DNQ
 1974 DNQ
 1975 DNQ
 1976 DNQ
 1988 Won League, Won Anavet Cup, Won Abbott Cup, Won 1988 Centennial Cup
Notre Dame Hounds defeated Weyburn Red Wings 4-games-to-none
Notre Dame Hounds defeated Nipawin Hawks 4-games-to-none
Notre Dame Hounds defeated Yorkton Terriers 4-games-to-2 SJHL CHAMPIONS
Notre Dame Hounds defeated Winnipeg South Blues (MJHL) 4-games-to-none ANAVET CUP CHAMPIONS
Notre Dame Hounds defeated Calgary Canucks (AJHL) 4-games-to-3 ABBOTT CUP CHAMPIONS
Second in 1988 Centennial Cup round robin (2-1)
Notre Dame Hounds defeated Pembroke Lumber Kings (CJHL) 7-3 in semi-final
Notre Dame Hounds defeated Halifax Lions (MVJHL) 3-2 in final CENTENNIAL CUP CHAMPIONS
 1989 Lost Semi-final
Notre Dame Hounds defeated Minot Americans 4-games-to-2
Nipawin Hawks defeated Notre Dame Hounds 4-games-to-2
 1990 DNQ
 1991 Lost Quarter-final
Yorkton Terriers defeated Notre Dame Hounds 4-games-to-none
 1992 DNQ
 1993 DNQ
 1994 Lost Quarter-final
Notre Dame Hounds defeated Estevan Bruins 3-games-to-1
Weyburn Red Wings defeated Notre Dame Hounds 4-games-to-1
 1995 DNQ
 1996 Lost Quarter-final
Notre Dame Hounds defeated Weyburn Red Wings 2-games-to-1
Yorkton Terriers defeated Notre Dame Hounds 4-games-to-none
 1997 Lost Quarter-final
Lebret Eagles defeated Notre Dame Hounds 4-games-to-2
 1998 Lost Quarter-final
Notre Dame Hounds defeated Melville Millionaires 2-games-to-1
Lebret Eagles defeated Notre Dame Hounds 4-games-to-2
 1999 Lost Semi-final
Notre Dame Hounds defeated Yorkton Terriers 4-games-to-3
Estevan Bruins defeated Notre Dame Hounds 4-games-to-1
 2000 Lost Quarter-final
First in round robin (3-1) vs. Melville Millionaires and La Ronge Ice Wolves
Weyburn Red Wings defeated Notre Dame Hounds 4-games-to-2
 2001 Lost Quarter-final
Weyburn Red Wings defeated Notre Dame Hounds 4-games-to-none
 2002 Lost Semi-final
Notre Dame Hounds defeated Weyburn Red Wings 4-games-to-2
Humboldt Broncos defeated Notre Dame Hounds 4-games-to-1
 2003 Lost Quarter-final
Melville Millionaires defeated Notre Dame Hounds 4-games-to-2
 2004 Lost Quarter-final
Weyburn Red Wings defeated Notre Dame Hounds 4-games-to-1
 2005 Lost Quarter-final
Second in round robin (1-3) vs. Yorkton Terriers and Estevan Bruins
Yorkton Terriers defeated Notre Dame Hounds 4-games-to-none
 2006 Lost Semi-final
First in round robin (2-1-1) vs. Yorkton Terriers and Melville Millionaires
Notre Dame Hounds defeated Melville Millionaires 4-games-to-none
Yorkton Terriers defeated Notre Dame Hounds 4-games-to-none
 2007 Lost Preliminary
Weyburn Red Wings defeated Notre Dame Hounds 4-games-to-1
 2008 DNQ
 2009 DNQ
 2010 Lost Quarter-final
Kindersley Klippers defeated Notre Dame Hounds 4-games-to-none
 2011 DNQ
 2012
Preliminary Round  Estevan Bruins defeated Notre Dame Hounds 3-games-to-none
 2013
Quarter Finals  Melville Millionaires defeated Notre Dame Hounds 4-games-to-3
 2014
Preliminary Round  Notre Dame Hounds defeated Nipawin Hawks 3-games-to-1
Quarter Finals  Yorkton Terriers defeated Notre Dame Hounds 4-games-to-1

NHL alumni 
 Rod Brind'Amour
 Wendel Clark
 Braydon Coburn
 Scott Daniels
 Jason Herter
 Curtis Joseph
 Vincent Lecavalier
 Brooks Macek
 Curtis McElhinney
 Joby Messier
 Mitch Messier
 Scott Munroe
 Tyler Myers
 Dwayne Norris
 Scott Pellerin
 Teddy Purcell
 Brad Richards
 Jaden Schwartz

See also
 List of ice hockey teams in Saskatchewan
 Athol Murray College of Notre Dame, the home of the Notre Dame Hounds

References

External links
 Notre Dame Hounds Website

Saskatchewan Junior Hockey League teams